Azzan Yadin-Israel is a Professor of Jewish Studies at Rutgers University. He holds a B.A. from Hebrew University and Ph.D. from University of California Berkeley and the Graduate Theological Union.

Selected publications

Yadin is also the translator of a two-volume collection of essays by Israeli scholar David Flusser entitled Judaism of the Second Temple Period (Grand Rapids: Eerdmans, 2007, 2009).

External Links
Personal website

References

Year of birth missing (living people)
Living people
University of California, Berkeley alumni
Hebrew University of Jerusalem alumni
Rutgers University faculty
Judaic scholars